First Methodist Episcopal Church, South is a historic church at 503 West Commercial Street in Ozark, Arkansas.  It is a -story stone structure, with a steeply pitched gable roof and a pair of square stone towers flanking the front-facing gable end.  The taller left side tower has belfry stage with grouped round-arch openings on each side, and both towers have crenellated tops. The church was built in 1909 for a congregation organized in 1871. The architect was Alonzo Klingensmith of Fort Smith.

The building was listed on the National Register of Historic Places in 1992.

See also
National Register of Historic Places listings in Franklin County, Arkansas

References

Methodist churches in Arkansas
Churches on the National Register of Historic Places in Arkansas
Gothic Revival church buildings in Arkansas
Churches completed in 1909
Churches in Franklin County, Arkansas
National Register of Historic Places in Franklin County, Arkansas